Celtic modern paganism refers to any type of modern paganism or contemporary pagan movements based on the ancient Celtic religion.

Types
Celtic Reconstructionist Paganism (CR) – Celtic polytheistic reconstructionism.
Celtic Neoshamanism – a kind of neoshamanism based on Michael Harner's "Core Shamanism"; proponents include John and Caitlin Matthews.
Neo-Druidism – which grew out of the Celtic revival in 18th century Romanticism.
Ár nDraíocht Féin (ADF), formed in 1983
Church of the Universal Bond
Order of Bards, Ovates and Druids (OBOD), formed in 1964
Reformed Druids of North America (RDNA), formed in 1963
The Druid Network, the first contemporary pagan organization to be recognized as a charity in the United Kingdom
The Druid Order, formed c. 1910 but claiming origins as early as 1717
Celtic Wicca – a loose syncretism of Wicca and Celtic mythology.

Celtic Reconstructionist Paganism

Celtic Reconstructionist Paganism (CR) is an umbrella term for Polytheistic Reconstructionist traditions which are based in one of the specific cultures of the Celtic-speaking peoples (such as Gaelic Polytheists or Welsh or Gaulish Reconstructionists). Celtic Reconstructionists strive to practice a historically accurate and authentic tradition, based on the folklore and living traditions in the Celtic Nations and the diaspora as well as primary sources in the Celtic languages. They reject the eclecticism and cultural appropriation of the broader Neopagan community.

Celtic Neoshamanism
Celtic Neoshamanism is a modern spiritual tradition that combines elements from Celtic myth and legend with Michael Harner's core shamanism. Proponents of Celtic Shamanism believe that its practices allow a deeper spiritual connection to those with a northern European heritage.<ref name="Conway">Conway, Deanna J (1994) By Oak, Ash and Thorn: Celtic Shamanism.  p.4</ref> Authors such as Jenny Blain have argued that "Celtic Shamanism" is a "construction" and an "ahistoric concept".

Neo-Druidism

Neo-Druidism is a form of modern spirituality or religion that generally promotes harmony and worship of nature gods.  Many forms of modern Druidism are Neopagan religions, whereas others are instead seen as philosophies that are not necessarily religious in nature.Orr, Emma Restall (2000) Druidry. Hammersmith, London: Thorsons. . p.7. Arising from the 18th century Romanticist movement in England, which glorified the ancient Celtic peoples of the Iron Age, the early Neo-druids aimed to imitate the Iron Age Celtic priests who were also known as druids. At the time, little accurate information was known about these ancient priests, and the modern druidic movement has no actual connection to them, despite some claims to the contrary made by modern druids.

Celtic Wicca

Celtic Wicca is a modern tradition of Wicca that incorporates some elements of Celtic mythology.Raeburn, Jane, Celtic Wicca: Ancient Wisdom for the 21st Century (2001),  It employs the same basic theology, rituals and beliefs as most other forms of Wicca. Celtic Wiccans use the names of Celtic deities, mythological figures, and seasonal festivals within a Wiccan ritual structure and belief system, rather than a historically Celtic one.Greer, John Michael, and Gordon Cooper (Summer 1998) "The Red God: Woodcraft and the Origins of Wicca". Gnosis Magazine, Issn. #48: Witchcraft & Paganism

See also
List of Neopagan movements
Neopaganism in the United Kingdom
Neopaganism in the United States

 References 

Further reading
Adler, Margot (1979) Drawing Down the Moon: Witches, Druids, Goddess-Worshippers, and Other Pagans in America Today.
Bonewits, Isaac (2006) Bonewits's Essential Guide to Druidism. New York, Kensington Publishing Group  Chapter 9: "Celtic Reconstructionists and other Nondruidic Druids".
Kondratiev, Alexei (1998) The Apple Branch: A Path to Celtic Ritual. San Francisco, Collins.  (1st edition),  (2nd edition) [also reprinted without revision under the title Celtic Rituals].
McColman, Carl (2003) The Complete Idiot's Guide to Celtic Wisdom. Alpha Press .
NicDhàna, Kathryn Price; Erynn Rowan Laurie, C. Lee Vermeers, Kym Lambert ní Dhoireann, et al. (2007) The CR FAQ – An Introduction to Celtic Reconstructionist Paganism''. River House Publishing. .

External links